Lis Tribler (born 1 January 1952) is a Danish politician. She is a member of the Social Democrats. She was the mayor of Slagelse Municipality from 1998 and until 2007, where the municipality was merged with Korsør Municipality, Skælskør Municipality and Hashøj Municipality to form a new Slagelse Municipality. She was the mayor in this merged municipality from 2007 and until 2013. She has been in the municipal council since 1990. She has a background as teacher.

References 

1952 births
Living people
Women mayors of places in Denmark
Danish municipal councillors
Mayors of places in Denmark
People from Korsør
Social Democrats (Denmark) politicians